Julián Alfonso Benítez (born 6 June 1987) is a Paraguayan international footballer who plays as a striker.

Career
Benítez has played in Paraguay, Mexico and Ecuador for Guaraní, León, Toros Neza, Nacional, LDU Quito, and Olimpia.

He made his international debut for Paraguay in 2011.

References

1987 births
Living people
Paraguayan footballers
Paraguayan expatriate footballers
Paraguay international footballers
Association football forwards
Club Guaraní players
Club León footballers
Toros Neza footballers
Club Nacional footballers
L.D.U. Quito footballers
Club Olimpia footballers
Centro Sportivo Alagoano players
Vila Nova Futebol Clube players
Paraguayan Primera División players
Resistencia S.C. footballers
Ecuadorian Serie A players
Ascenso MX players
Campeonato Brasileiro Série B players
Paraguayan expatriate sportspeople in Mexico
Expatriate footballers in Mexico
Paraguayan expatriate sportspeople in Ecuador
Expatriate footballers in Ecuador
Paraguayan expatriate sportspeople in Brazil
Expatriate footballers in Brazil